Neufchâteau is a village of Wallonia and a district of the municipality of Dalhem, located in the province of Liège, Belgium. 

Prior to 1977 Neufchâteau was a municipality of its own. As of 2005, it has 854 inhabitants.

References 
 Dalhem official website

Former municipalities of Liège Province
Dalhem